Mercy Regional College is a Catholic, co-educational, secondary college in Camperdown, Victoria, Australia. It currently serves students from years 7 to 12 located across its two campuses, McAuley Campus and O'Keeffe Campus. McAuley campus is the main campus located in Camperdown, Victoria and O'Keffe Campus being located in Noorat, Victoria.

Mercy Regional College has been educating since 1973 and serves the parishes of Camperdown, Mortlake, Terang and Timboon.

The school consists of a junior school (years 7 and 8), middle school (years 9 and 10) and a senior school (years 11 and 12). The senior school offers both VCE and VCAL and in year 11, several students participate in studying one Unit 3/4 VCE subject.

Catholic secondary schools in Victoria (Australia)
Educational institutions established in 1973
1973 establishments in Australia